The Axe of Wandsbek (German: Das Beil von Wandsbek) may refer to:

 , a novel by German writer Arnold Zweig
 The Axe of Wandsbek (1951 film), a 1951 East German film based on the novel and directed by Falk Harnack
 , a 1982 West German film based on the novel and directed by Horst Königstein und Heinrich Breloer